Taman Scientex (Jawi: تامن سچياينتيقس) is a township in Pasir Gudang, Johor, Malaysia. This townships is located between Masai and Pasir Gudang.

Pasir Gudang
Towns and suburbs in Johor Bahru District